The 2017 Copa do Brasil (officially the Copa Continental Pneus do Brasil 2017 for sponsorship reasons) was the 29th edition of the Copa do Brasil football competition. It was held between February 8 and September 27, 2017. The competition was contested by 91 teams, which qualified either by participating in their respective state championships (70), by the 2017 CBF ranking (10), by the 2016 Copa do Nordeste (1), by the 2016 Copa Verde (1), by the 2016 Série B (1) or qualified for the 2017 Copa Libertadores (8). Copa Verde, Copa do Nordeste and Série B champions, and the 8 Copa Libertadores clubs entered the competition in the round of 16.

Cruzeiro defeated Flamengo on penalties in the finals to win their fifth title. They also earned the right to play in the 2018 Copa Libertadores Group stage and the 2018 Copa do Brasil Round of 16. Diego (Flamengo) and Gatito Fernández (Botafogo) won best player and best goalkeeper awards, respectively.

Grêmio were the defending champions, but were eliminated by Cruzeiro in the semi-finals.

Format
The competition was a single elimination knockout tournament, the first two rounds featuring a single match and the other rounds featuring two-legged ties. The winner qualified for the 2018 Copa Libertadores.

Qualified teams
Teams in bold qualified directly for the round of 16.

Draw
A draw for the first round was held by CBF on December 15, 2016, 11:00 BRST at CBF headquarters in Rio de Janeiro. The 80 qualified teams were divided in eight groups (A-H) with 10 teams each. That division was based on the 2017 CBF ranking and the matches were drawn from the respective confronts: A vs. E; B vs. F; C vs. G; D vs. H. The lower ranked teams hosted the first round match.

Seeding

2017 CBF ranking shown in brackets.

First round

In the first round, each match was played on a single-legged basis. The lower ranked team hosted the match and, in tie cases, the higher ranked team advanced to next round.

Second round

In the second round, each match was played on a single-legged basis. In case of tie, the qualified team was determined by penalty shoot-out.

Third round

In the third round, each match was played on a home-and-away two-legged basis. If tied on aggregate, the away goals rule would be used. If still tied, extra time would not be played, and the penalty shoot-out would be used to determine the winner.

Fourth round

A draw for the fourth round was held by CBF on March 17, 2017. In the fourth round, each match was played on a home-and-away two-legged basis. If tied on aggregate, the away goals rule would be used. If still tied, extra time would not be played, and the penalty shoot-out would be used to determine the winner.

Knockout stages

Bracket

Round of 16
A draw  for the round of 16 was held by CBF on April 20, 2017.

Quarter-finals
A draw for the quarter-finals was held by CBF on June 5, 2017.

Semi-finals
A draw for the semi-finals was held by CBF on July 31, 2017.

Final

Top goalscorers

References

 
2017
2017 in Brazilian football
2017 domestic association football cups